James Edward William Theobald Butler, 3rd Marquess of Ormonde,  (5 October 1844 – 26 October 1919), styled Earl of Ossory until 1854, was an Irish nobleman and member of the Butler dynasty.

Family and Residences
He was the son of John Butler, 2nd Marquess of Ormonde and Frances Jane Paget. From birth until the death of his father in 1854, he was styled as Earl of Ossory, one of his father's subsidiary titles.

He was the last Marquess of Ormonde to live at Kilkenny Castle. He and his wife entertained King Edward VII and Queen Alexandra at the castle in 1904.

On 2 February 1876, he married Lady Elizabeth Harriet Grosvenor, daughter of Hugh Grosvenor, 1st Duke of Westminster, widely regarded to be the richest peer in England in the second half of the 19th century. The Duke settled £15,000 on Lady Elizabeth upon her marriage; Lord and Lady Ormonde leased 32 Upper Brook St in London as their London home from the Duke of Westminster from 1881 to 1921 (Lady Ormonde continued to lease the property after Lord Ormonde's death in 1919). 

They had two daughters:

Lady Beatrice Butler (1876–1952), married with Lt.-Gen. Sir Reginald Pole-Carew, had issue.
Lady Constance Mary Butler (1879–1949), died unmarried.

The 1901 Census of Ireland records that the Ormondes' Household at Kilkenny included a Butler, Housekeeper, Cook, three Ladies Maids, a Lodge Keeper, two Footmen, one 'Odd Man', three Housemaids, two Dairy Maids, one Still Room Maid, one Scullery Maid, one Kitchen Maid, a Hospital Nurse and a Professional Nurse.

Career
A Colonel in the Royal East Kent Mounted Rifles and Commodore of the Royal Yacht Squadron, he was Vice-Admiral of Leinster and a member of the Privy Council of Ireland. He was awarded the Order of the Crown of Prussia (first class). He was invested as a Knight, Order of St Patrick in 1888. He held the office of Lord-Lieutenant of County Kilkenny between 1878 and 1919.

Lord Ormonde visited South Africa in 1903.

Lord Ormonde is recorded as having written to the then Prime Minister of the United Kingdom, Benjamin Disraeli, regarding the restoration of the Dukedom of Ormonde in October 1868. Ormonde claimed that his grandfather, James Butler, 1st Marquess of Ormonde (then 19th Earl of Ormond) had been advised by Lord Liverpool to apply for the restoration of the Dukedom, and that Lord Liverpool had advised him that in order to achieve this, he would first need to apply to be elevated from the rank of Earl to Marquess. An application was duly made, and James, 19th Earl of Ormond was granted the title Marquess of Ormonde. The 3rd Marquess believed that Lord Liverpool's loss of the Office of Prime Minister in 1827 frustrated this plan, and the 1st Marquess took no further action towards applying for the restoration of the Dukedom. The 3rd Marquess also alleged in his letter to Prime Minister Disraeli that his father, John Butler, 2nd Marquess of Ormonde had resolved not to pursue the restoration of the Dukedom of Ormonde unless another peer was also elevated to a Dukedom during his lifetime. Disraeli responded to the 3rd Marquess' letter on 27 October 1868, and expressed his sympathy with Lord Ormonde's desire to restore "the title of an illustrious ancestor". However, in his letter Disraeli implied that the political climate of the time did not render the creation, or restoration, of the Dukedom of Ormonde to be appropriate, noting that "the condition of the party [the Conversation Party] is now critical,".

Succession

Upon his death, the family titles passed to his brother Lord Arthur Butler due to his lack of a male heir. Elizabeth, Dowager Marchioness of Ormonde, was granted an annuity of £3,000 per year under his will. She had also inherited a further £20,000 upon the death of her father in 1899. Lord Ormonde's total estate (including entailed property) was valued at approximately £450,000

References

External links
 

1844 births
1919 deaths
Knights of St Patrick
Lord-Lieutenants of Kilkenny
James
Members of the Privy Council of Ireland
James 3